United Nations Security Council resolution 662, adopted unanimously on 9 August 1990, recalling resolutions 660 (1990) and 661 (1990), the Council decided that the annexation of Kuwait by Iraq under any form was illegal.

The Council called upon all States and international organisations not to recognise the annexation, further asking States to refrain from any action that may constitute an indirect recognition of the annexation. It also demanded Iraq rescind its actions in Kuwait after the invasion, keeping the situation on its agenda.

See also
 Foreign relations of Iraq
 Gulf War
 Invasion of Kuwait
 Iraq–Kuwait relations
 List of United Nations Security Council Resolutions 601 to 700 (1987–1991)

References
Text of the Resolution at undocs.org

External links
 

 0662
 0662
Gulf War
1990 in Iraq
1990 in Kuwait
 0662
August 1990 events